The 1981–82 English football season was Aston Villa's 82nd season in the Football League.

As defending First Division champions for the first time in 71 years, they qualified for the European Cup for the first time in their history. Their first game in the competition was against Valur of Iceland, following by a second round clash with BFC Dynamo of East Germany, Dynamo Kiev of the Soviet Union in the quarter-finals and then Anderlecht of Belgium in the semi-finals before beating Bayern Munich of West Germany 1–0 in the Final in Rotterdam, with Peter Withe scoring the winning goal.

The season began with Ron Saunders, who had been the club's manager since 1974, still in charge, but he resigned on 9 February 1982 following a disagreement with the board over his contract. He had been in charge for nearly eight years, winning a league title and two League Cups in the process. His successor was his assistant manager Tony Barton, who had been in charge for three months by the time Villa won the European Cup.

First-team squad
Squad at end of season

First Division

League table

European Cup

First round

First leg

Second leg

Villa won 7–0 on aggregate.

Second round

First leg

Second leg

2–2 on aggregate. Villa won on away goals rule.

Quarter final

First leg

Second legVilla won 2–0 on aggregate.Semi-final

First leg

Second legVilla won 1–0 on aggregate.'''

Final

References

 

English football clubs 1981–82 season
Aston Villa F.C. seasons
UEFA Champions League-winning seasons